The Coat of Arms of Greater Mumbai (used by the Municipal Corporation of Greater Mumbai, the governing body of the city of Mumbai) is the official coat of arms of the city of Mumbai. It is a four-panel shield supported by an intertwining floral border in gold.

Design
It is a four-panel shield supported by an intertwining floral border in gold and features a lotus in bloom, an emblem of purity and beauty, at the bottom, and is surmounted lion puissant. 
Top Left The Gateway of India, one of Mumbai’s most prominent landmarks, signifies the position of Mumbai as a veritable gateway to India. 
Top Right A symbolic factory inscribed in a cog wheel signifies the industrial importance of Mumbai.
Bottom Left The three sailing ships in outline denote Mumbai’s pre-eminence as a port and commercial centre.
Bottom Right A symbolized diagram of the Corporation building depicting the seat of Local Self Government in Mumbai.
The motto यतो धर्मस्ततो जय:, Yato Dharmas Tato Jayaḥ, (Where there is Righteousness, there shall be Victory)  in Sanskrit is inscribed in gold at the bottom.

History
The coat of arms for what the city that was at the time known as Bombay was introduced in 1888. It depicted a lion puissant holding a shield. The current design draws inspiration from this former design.

See also
 Municipal Corporation of Greater Mumbai
 Municipal Corporation Building, Mumbai (for details on the buildings architecture)
 Administrative divisions of Mumbai
 Mayor of Mumbai
 Municipal Commissioner of Mumbai
 Sheriff of Mumbai
 Emblem of Maharashtra

External links
 

Mumbai
Brihanmumbai Municipal Corporation
Mumbai
Mumbai
Mumbai
Mumbai